was a Japanese domain of the Edo period.  It is associated with Hizen Province in modern-day Nagasaki Prefecture.

In the han system, Hirado was a political and economic abstraction based on periodic cadastral surveys and projected agricultural yields.  In other words, the domain was defined in terms of kokudaka, not land area. This was different from the feudalism of the West.

History
After Toyotomi Hideyoshi’s successful conquest of Kyushu, local warlord Matsura Shigenobu was confirmed in Hirado County, Iki Island and Hario Island to be his domain. During the Japanese invasions of Korea, Hirado was a forward base of operations for Japanese forces. In 1599, Matsura Shigenobu erected a castle called Hinotake-jō on the site of the present-day Hirado Castle. However, he burned the castle down himself in 1613, as a gesture of loyalty towards Shōgun Tokugawa Ieyasu, having served in the losing Toyotomi side during the Battle of Sekigahara. In return, he was allowed to retain his position as daimyō of Hirado Domain under the Tokugawa bakufu.

The present Hirado Castle was constructed in 1704 by order of the 5th daimyō of Hirado domain, Matsura Takashi with the assistance of the Tokugawa shogunate to be the keystone in seaward defenses of Japan in the East China Sea region, now that the country had implemented a policy of national seclusion against western traders and missionaries. Also during the period of Matsura Takashi, a subsidiary domain (Hirado Shinden Domain) of 10,000 koku was created for his younger brother, Matsura Masashi. Matsura Takashi served in a number of important posts in the Tokugawa Shogunate, including that of Jisha-bugyō, a post traditionally reserved only for fudai daimyō. However, his expenses in rebuilding Hirado Castle all but bankrupted the domain.

The 9th daimyō, Matsura Kiyoshi, was a noted essayist and political commentator. The final daimyō, Matsura Akira, commanded his forces as part of the Satchō Alliance during the Boshin War of the Meiji Restoration, in support of Emperor Meiji, and fought at the Battle of Toba–Fushimi and against the Tokugawa remnants of the Ōuetsu Reppan Dōmei in northern Japan, at Morioka and Akita. In April 1884, he was made a count in the new kazoku peerage system. From 1890, he served in the House of Peers of the Diet of Japan. He was later awarded 2nd Court rank.

Territories of the Hirado Domain at the end of the Edo period

It also includes the territory of the Hirado Shinden Domain which was incorporated in 1870.

Hizen Province :
Matsuura County : 47 villages
Sonogi County : 7 villages
Iki Province :
Iki County : 11 villages
Ishida County : 11 villages

List of daimyōs 
The hereditary daimyōs were head of the clan and head of the domain.

 Matsura clan, 1637–1868 (tozama; 60,000 koku)

{| class=wikitable
!  ||Name || Tenure || Courtesy title || Court Rank || Revenue
|-
||1||||1587–1600||Hizen-no-kami || Lower 4th (従四位下) ||63,200 koku
|-
||2||||1600–1602||Hizen-no-kami || Lower 5th (従五位下) ||63,200 koku
|-
||3||||1603–1637||Hizen-no-kami || Lower 5th (従五位下) ||63,200 koku
|-
||4||||1637–1689||Hizen-no-kami || Lower 5th (従五位下) ||61,700 koku
|-
||5||||1689–1713||Hizen-no-kami, Jisha-bugyō || Lower 5th (従五位下) ||51,700 koku
|-
||6||||1713–1727||Hizen-no-kami || Lower 5th (従五位下) ||51,700 koku
|-
||7||||1727–1728||Hizen-no-kami || Lower 5th (従五位下) ||51,700 koku
|-
||8||||1728–1775||Hizen-no-kami || Lower 5th (従五位下) ||51,700 koku
|-
||9||||1775–1806||Iki-no-kami || Lower 5th (従五位下) ||51,700 koku
|-
||10||||1806–1841||Hizen-no-kami || Lower 5th (従五位下) ||51,700 koku
|-
||11||||1841–1858||Iki-no-kami || Lower 5th (従五位下) ||51,700 koku
|-
||12||||1858–1871||Hizen-no-kami || 2nd (正二位), Count (伯爵) ||61,700 koku
|-
|}

See also 
 List of Han
 Abolition of the han system

References

Domains of Japan